The 16th Politburo of the Chinese Communist Party was elected by the 16th Central Committee of the Chinese Communist Party on November 15, 2002.  It was nominally preceded by the 15th Politburo of the Chinese Communist Party.  This was the main vanguard executive committee functioning within the Politburo Standing Committee of the Chinese Communist Party.  It was formally superseded by the 17th Politburo of the Chinese Communist Party.

Standing Committee Members
Ordered in political position ranking
Hu Jintao
Wu Bangguo
Wen Jiabao
Jia Qinglin
Zeng Qinghong
Huang Ju (died in office, 2007)
Wu Guanzheng
Li Changchun
Luo Gan

Members
In stroke order of surnames:

Wang Lequan, Party secretary of Xinjiang
Wang Zhaoguo, Vice-chairman of the National People's Congress Standing Committee; chair, All-China Federation of Trade Unions
Hui Liangyu, Vice-Premier
Liu Qi, Party Secretary of Beijing
Liu Yunshan, Head of the Propaganda Department
Li Changchun, Chairman of the Central Guidance Commission for Spiritual Civilization
Wu Yi, Vice-Premier
Wu Bangguo, Chairman of the National People's Congress Standing Committee
Wu Guanzheng, Head of Central Discipline Inspection Commission
Zhang Lichang, Party secretary of Tianjin
Zhang Dejiang, Party secretary of Guangdong
Chen Liangyu, Party secretary of Shanghai (suspended 2006)
Luo Gan, Secretary of the Political and Legal Affairs Commission
Zhou Yongkang, State Councilor, Minister of Public Security
Hu Jintao, General Secretary of the Communist Party, President of China, Chairman of the Central Military Commission
Yu Zhengsheng, Party secretary of Hubei
He Guoqiang, Head of the Organization Department
Jia Qinglin, Chairman of the Chinese People's Political Consultative Conference
Guo Boxiong, Vice-chairman, Central Military Commission
Huang Ju, Vice-Premier (died in office in June 2007)
Cao Gangchuan, State Councilor, Minister of Defense
Zeng Qinghong, vice-president, Principal of Central Party School
Zeng Peiyan, Vice-Premier
Wen Jiabao, Premier

Alternate Member
Wang Gang (Director of the General Office of the Chinese Communist Party)

References

External links 
  Gazette of the 1st Session of the 16th CPC Central Committee

Politburo of the Chinese Communist Party
2002 in China